Jordan Cekov – Dane (15 July 1921 – 20 November 2019)  was a Macedonian partisan who participated in the World War II in Yugoslav Macedonia as the commander of the Third Macedonian Assault Brigade and was later member of the first Parliament of the People's Republic of Macedonia. Cekov was born in Kumanovo. He received the "Partisan Memorial 1941" and other military decorations. He died in Skopje, aged 98.

Bibliography
Kumanovo NOB 1941–1945 book I
Kumanovo NOB 1941–1945 second II
Kumanovo NOB 1941–1945 Book III
Hristijan Todorovski Karpoš Macedonian national hero
Pance Peshev- penalty blamed
They died for the freedom of Macedonia
Open letter to Vera Aceva
My true for Liberation War
Bojan Zafirovski – Bojcho
As it was liberated Skopje
Kumanovo and Kozjak region in the Liberation War II 1941 – 1945

See also
 List of people from Kumanovo

References

People from Kumanovo
1921 births
2019 deaths
Macedonian journalists
Male journalists
Yugoslav journalists